Sub-bituminous coal is a lower grade of coal that contains 35–45% carbon. The properties of this type are between those of lignite, the lowest grade of coal, and those of bituminous coal, the second-highest grade of coal. Sub-bituminous coal is primarily used as a fuel for steam-electric power generation.

Properties

Sub-bituminous coals may be dull, dark brown to black, soft and crumbly at the lower end of the range, to bright jet-black, hard, and relatively strong at the upper end. They contain 15-30% inherent moisture by weight and are non-coking (undergo little swelling upon heating). The heat content of sub-bituminous coals range from 8300 to 11,500 BTu/lb or 19.3 to 26.7 MJ/kg. Their relatively low density and high water content renders some types of sub-bituminous coals susceptible to spontaneous combustion if not packed densely during storage in order to exclude free air flow.

Reserves 

A major source of sub-bituminous coal in the United States is the Powder River Basin in Wyoming.

Current use 

Sub-bituminous coals, in the United States, typically have a sulfur content less than 1% by weight, which makes them an attractive choice for power plants to reduce SO2 emissions under the Acid Rain Program.

See also
 Types of Coal
 List of CO2 emitted per million Btu of energy from various fuels
 Anthracite
 Bituminous Coal
 Lignite
 Coal Mining
 Coal Mining in the United States
 Coal-fired power station

References 

Coal

it:Carbone#Litantrace sub-bituminoso